Claudia Rusca (1593 – 6 October 1676) was an Italian composer, singer, and organist.

She was a nun at the Umiliate monastery of St. Caterina in Brera. She learned music at home, before she professed her final vows at the convent. She probably wrote her Sacri concerti à 1–5 con salmi e canzoni francesi (Milan, 1630) for use in the monastery and similar female institutions. The only known copy was thought to be destroyed in a fire at the Biblioteca Ambrosiana in 1943.

However, International Music Score Library Project has a facsimile available as well as modern editions of “Sacri concerti”.

References
Robert L. Kendrick. "Claudia Rusca", Grove Music Online, ed. L. Macy (accessed November 6, 2006), grovemusic.com (subscription access).
Free scores by Claudia Rusca at the International Music Score Library Project

Notes

Italian Baroque composers
Italian women classical composers
Italian women singers
Italian classical organists
1593 births
1676 deaths
17th-century Italian Roman Catholic religious sisters and nuns
17th-century Italian composers
Women organists
17th-century women composers